I Like 'Em Country is the sixth solo studio album by American country music singer-songwriter Loretta Lynn. It was released on March 28, 1966, by Decca Records.

The album features only one song written by Lynn, "Dear Uncle Sam". It also includes covers of other artists' hits, including Hank Williams' "Your Cheatin' Heart" and Johnny Cash's "Cry, Cry, Cry".

Critical reception

A review published in the April 9, 1966 issue of Billboard said, ""Dear Uncle Sam" was a big hit for Loretta Lynn, and this album, which contains the tune, should leap onto the Hot Country Albums Chart. The stereo is great and Loretta comes through in fine style on country standards like "Jealous Heart", "It's Been So Long, Darling", and "Your Cheatin' Heart".

Commercial performance 
The album debuted at No. 27 on the US Billboard Hot Country Albums chart dated April 23, 1966. It peaked at No. 2 on the chart dated June 4. The album spent 29 weeks on the chart, 14 of which were in the top 10.

The first single, "The Home You're Tearin' Down" was released in July 1965 and peaked at No. 10 on the US Billboard Hot Country Singles chart. The second single, "Dear Uncle Sam", was released in December 1965 and peaked at No. 4.

Recording
Recording for the album began on November 15, 1965 at Columbia Recording Studio in Nashville, Tennessee. Two additional recording sessions followed on January 6 and 13, 1966. Three songs on the album were from sessions for previous albums. "Go On and Go" was recorded during the February 26, 1964 session for 1964's Before I'm Over You; "The Home You're Tearin' Down" was recorded during the March 4, 1965 session for 1965's Blue Kentucky Girl; and "Today Has Been a Day" was recorded during the October 15, 1964 session for 1965's Songs from My Heart.....

Track listing

Personnel
Adapted from the Decca recording session records.
Willie Ackerman – drums
Harold Bradley – electric bass guitar
Owen Bradley – producer
David Briggs – piano
Floyd Cramer – piano
Ray Edenton – acoustic guitar
Buddy Harman – drums
Don Helms – steel guitar
Kelso Herston – guitar
Junior Huskey – bass
The Jordanaires – background vocals
Jerry Kennedy – guitar
Loretta Lynn – lead vocals
Grady Martin – electric guitar, guitar
Bob Moore – bass
Wayne Moss – guitar
Hal Rugg – steel guitar
Pete Wade – guitar
Joe Zinkan – bass

Charts
Album

Singles

References 

1966 albums
Loretta Lynn albums
Albums produced by Owen Bradley
Decca Records albums